KBBO (1390 AM) is a radio station licensed to Yakima, Washington, United States; the station serves the Yakima area. It carries a sports talk format. The station is currently owned by Stephens Media Group.

History 

With a power of 250 watts, the station signed on the air in 1947 as KYAK at 1400 kHz. To increase power to 1000 watts day and 500 at night, the station reduced its frequency to 1390 kHz. In 1957, adopting a rock n' roll format and under the ownership of Warren Durham and Bill Shela, the station changed its call letters from KYAK to KLOQ.

In 1963, KLOQ was sold and the call letters were changed to KBBO A religious format was adopted.

In 2012, after New Northwest Broadcasters went into receivership, its stations in Washington were sold to James Ingstad of Fargo, North Dakota.

On August 29, 2013, KBBO and its talk format moved from 980 AM to 1390 AM, swapping frequencies with classic country-formatted KTCR.

On February 25, 2015, KBBO changed their format to sports, branded as "1390 The Fan".

On September 23, 2015, AllAccess.com reported that Ingstad has asked the Federal Communications Commission to allow the station to go silent due to "transmitter failure."

In April 2018, Ingstad Radio sold 14 of its stations in Yakima and the Tri-Cities to Stephens Media Group.

References

External links

Sports radio stations in the United States
BBO (AM)
Radio stations established in 1947
1947 establishments in Washington (state)
Fox Sports Radio stations